Frank–Ter Haar syndrome (FTHS), also known as Ter Haar-syndrome, is a rare disease characterized by abnormalities that affect bone, heart, and eye development. Children born with the disease usually die very young.

Presentations
The primary characteristics of FTHS are brachycephaly (flat head), wide fontanelle (soft spot on a baby's head), prominent forehead, hypertelorism (abnormally wide distance between the eyes), prominent eyes, macrocornea (large corneas), optic disc edema, full cheeks, small chin, bowing of the long bones in the arms or legs, and finger deformities. Protruding, simple ears and a prominent coccyx (tailbone) are also regarded as important diagnostic signs of FTHS.

Genetic
Genetic mapping in several families with FTHS linked the disease to an inherited mutation in the gene that codes for the protein Tks4. Tks4 was already known for its role in the formation of cellular projections known as podosomes, which allow cells to migrate. A mouse model that lacks the Tks4 gene shows all the symptoms of FTHS confirmed the hypothesis that Tks4 mutation is responsible for the disease.

Diagnosis

Treatment
There is no treatment for FTHS, though identification of TKS4 mutation as a causative factor may eventually provide new opportunities for neonatal screening in high-risk families.

History
In 1973, researchers led by Yitzchak Frank, most recently at Mount Sinai Hospital in New York, described an 18-month-old Bedouin girl, born to consanguineous parents, who presented with enlarged corneas, multiple bone abnormalities, and developmental delay. In 1982, Dutch pediatrician Ben ter Haar reported on three similar patients thought to have Melnick–Needles syndrome. Over the next twenty years, several more similar cases were identified and eventually attributed to a new disorder, now called Frank–Ter Haar syndrome. FTHS is distinguished from other similar conditions based on its pattern of inheritance and association with congenital glaucoma and congenital heart disease.

References

External links 

Syndromes affecting the eye
Rare syndromes
Syndromes with craniofacial abnormalities